Amphitretidae is a family of mesopelagic octopods which contains three subfamilies, formerly classified as families in their own right. It is classified in the superfamily Octopodoidea. Species in the family Amphipetridae are characterised by having a single row of suckers on each arm (uniserial suckers), a gelatinous body and non hemispherical eyes.

Taxonomy
There are three subfamilies within Amphipetridae:

 Subfamily Amphitretinae Hoyle, 1886
 Genus Amphitretus Hoyle, 1885
 Subfamily Bolitaeninae Chun, 1911
 Genus Bolitaena Steenstrup, 1859
 Genus Japetella Hoyle, 1885
 Genus Dorsopsis Thore, 1949 (taxon inquirendum)
 Subfamily Vitreledonellinae Robson, 1932
 Genus Vitreledonella Joubin, 1918

References

Octopuses
Taxa named by William Evans Hoyle